The grand vizier of the Ottoman Empire ( or Sadr-ı Azam (Sadrazam); Ottoman Turkish:  or ) was the de facto prime minister of the sultan in the Ottoman Empire, with the absolute power of attorney and, in principle, removable only by the sultan himself in the classical period, before the Tanzimat reforms, or until the 1908 Revolution. He held the imperial seal and could summon all other viziers to attend to affairs of the state in the Imperial Council; the viziers in conference were called "kubbe viziers" in reference to their meeting place, the Kubbealtı ('under-the-dome') in Topkapı Palace. His offices were located at the Sublime Porte.

History

During the emerging phases of the Ottoman state, "vizier" was the only title used. The first of these Ottoman viziers who was titled "grand vizier" was Çandarlı Kara Halil Hayreddin Pasha (also known as Çandarlı Halil Pasha the Elder). The purpose in instituting the title "grand vizier" was to differentiate the holder of the sultan's seal from other viziers. The initially more regularly used title of vezir-i âzam was slowly replaced by sadrazam, both meaning grand vizier in practice. Throughout Ottoman history, the grand viziers have also been called sadr-ı âlî ('high vizier'), vekil-i mutlak ('absolute attorney'), sâhib-i devlet ('holder of the state'), serdar-ı ekrem ('gracious general'), serdar-ı azam ('grand general') and zât-ı âsafî ('vizieral person') and başnazır, literally "prime minister" in Ottoman Turkish.

In the late periods of the Ottoman Empire, especially during and after the 19th century, the grand vizier began to hold a position almost identical to that of a prime minister in other European states. Reforms seen during and after the Tanzimat (1838), the First Constitutional Era (1876–1878), and the Second Constitutional Era (1908–1920) further brought the office of the grand vizier in line with the European standard, making the incumbent the head of a Cabinet of other ministers. During the two constitutional eras, the grand vizier also served as the speaker of the Senate, the upper house of the bicameral Ottoman Parliament. With the establishment of the Republic of Turkey in 1923, the Prime Minister of Turkey took on the roles of the former office.

Grand viziers were often replaced or resigned in rapid succession, frequently leading to political instability. In the final 10 years of the Empire alone, the office of the grand vizier changed hands 13 times between 12 men; some, such as Ahmed Izzet Pasha and Salih Hulusi Pasha, held office for less than a month.

Absolute monarchy (1320–1839)

Tanzimat (1839–1876) 
The Gülhane edict was announced soon after Abdul Mecid's sword girthing, ushering in the Tanzimat period, a time of major bureaucratic and administrative reform.

First Constitutional Monarchy (1876–1878) 
Under pressure from the Young Ottomans which overthrew his relatives Abdul Aziz and Murad V, Abdul Hamid II promulgated a constitution and parliament upon his ascension to the throne.

İstibdat (1878–1908) 
Abdul Hamid II suspended the constitution and parliament in the aftermath of the 1877–1878 Russo Turkish war, and ruled the Ottoman Empire for the next three decades in a personal dictatorship. Historians have dubbed this era of Ottoman history as İstibdat (despotism).

Second Constitutional Monarchy (1908–1920) 
The Young Turks force Abdul Hamid II to reinstate the constitution and parliament on 24 July 1908. Political parties were introduced in the Second Constitutional Era.

Last Grand Viziers (1920–1922) 
Following the end of the Second Constitutional Era in 1920, the Ottoman Empire was in a state of diarchy, with the government based in Constantinople and the government based in Ankara both asserting themselves as the legitimate Turkish government. Mehmed VI abolished the constitution and suspends parliament when the Chamber of Deputies voted in support of the National Pact in the Turkish War of Independence.

During the Conference of London, Ahmet Tevfik Pasha recognized the ambassador of the Grand National Assembly as the legitimate government of Turkey. On 1 November 1922, the Grand National Assembly voted to abolish the Sultanate. Ahmet Tevfik Pasha was the last grand vizier of the Ottoman Empire, and resigned from the premiership on November 4, 1922, without a replacement.

Prime Minister of the Government of the Grand National Assembly (1920–1923)

See also
List of prime ministers of Turkey
List of sultans of the Ottoman Empire
List of Kapudan Pashas

References

Sources

 
Grand Viziers
Ottoman titles